hCalendar (short for HTML iCalendar) is a microformat standard for displaying a semantic (X)HTML representation of iCalendar-format calendar information about an event, on web pages, using HTML classes and rel attributes.

It allows parsing tools (for example other websites, or browser add-ons like Firefox's Operator extension) to extract the details of the event, and display them using some other website, index or search them, or to load them into a calendar or diary program, for instance. Multiple instances can be displayed as timelines.

Example

Consider this semi-fictional example:

   The English Wikipedia was launched
   on 15 January 2001 with a party from 
   2-4pm at 
   Jimmy Wales' house 
   (more information).

The HTML mark-up might be:

<p>
    The English Wikipedia was launched 
    on 15 January 2001 with a party from 
    2-4pm at 
    Jimmy Wales' house 
    (<a href="http://en.wikipedia.org/wiki/History_of_Wikipedia">more information</a>)
</p>

hCalendar mark-up may be added using span HTML elements and the classes vevent, summary, dtstart (start date), dtend (end date), location and url:

<p class="vevent">
    The <span class="summary">English Wikipedia was launched</span> 
    on 15 January 2001 with a party from 
    <abbr class="dtstart" title="2001-01-15T14:00:00+06:00">2pm</abbr>-
    <abbr class="dtend" title="2001-01-15T16:00:00+06:00">4pm</abbr> at 
    <span class="location">Jimmy Wales' house</span> 
    (<a class="url" href="http://en.wikipedia.org/wiki/History_of_Wikipedia">more information</a>)
</p>

Note the use of the abbr element to contain the machine readable, ISO8601, date-time format for the start and end times.

Accessibility concerns

Concerns have been expressed that, where it occurs, the use of the abbr element (using the so-called abbr-design-pattern) in the above manner causes accessibility problems, not least for users of screen readers and aural browsers. The newer h-event microformat therefore uses the HTML5 element time instead:
<time class="dt-start" datetime="2013-06-30 12:00">30<sup>th</sup> June 2013, 12:00</time>

Geo
The Geo microformat is a part of the hCalendar specification, and is often used to include the coordinates of the event's location within an hCalendar.

Attributes

For a full list of attributes, see the hCalendar cheat-sheet.

Users
Notable organisations and other websites using hCalendar include:

Birmingham Town Hall and Symphony Hall
Facebook
Google (in Google maps and in Search Engine Results Pages )
The Opera web browser website
The Radio Times
The University of Bath
The University of Washington
Upcoming.org
Wikipedia
Yahoo!, on Yahoo! Local

References

External links
 hCalendar at the Microformats Wiki

Microformats